Douglas Morgan (18 June 1890 – 31 December 1916) was a Scottish professional footballer who played as a left back in the Football League for Hull City.

Personal life 
Morgan served as a gunner in the Royal Garrison Artillery during the First World War and died at a Field Ambulance in West Flanders on New Year's Eve 1916, of wounds caused by a shell blast. He was buried in Vlamertinghe Military Cemetery.

Career statistics

Honours 
Inverkeithing Renton
 Fife Cup: 1910–11
Inverkeithing United
 Scottish Junior Cup: 1912–13

References

1890 births
1916 deaths
Scottish footballers
English Football League players
Association football fullbacks
British Army personnel of World War I
Royal Garrison Artillery soldiers
British military personnel killed in World War I
Hull City A.F.C. players
People from Inverkeithing
Inverkeithing United F.C. players
Footballers from Fife
Scottish Junior Football Association players
Military personnel from Fife